Events from the year 1864 in Denmark.

Incumbents
 Monarch – Christian IX
 Prime minister – Ditlev Gothard Monrad (until 11 July), Christian Albrecht Bluhme

Events

 1 February – The Second Schleswig War breaks out after the First Schleswig War had left the Schleswig-Holstein Question unsettled when Treussia-Austria crosses the River Eider with 57,000 soldiers.
 February
 It soon results in the Evacuation of Danevirke.
 The Battle of Sankelmark, a minor battle which occurs at Sankelmark, on the road between Schleswig and Flensburg, during the Danish retreat from Danevirke.
 17 March – The Battle of Jasmund near the Prussian island of Rügen results in a tactical Danish victory.

 17 and 18 April – Denmark suffers a severe defeat to the German Confederation in the Battle of Dybbøl which effectively decides the war.
 9 May – Denmark wins a tactical victory in the Battle of Heligoland but it has no impact on the outcome of the war.
 12 May – A  general armistice came into effect, Denmark has lost the war.
 29 June – In the Battle of Als, the last major engagement of the war, the Prussians secure Als after a night attack masterminded by the Chief of Staff Leonhard Graf von Blumenthal,
 3 July – The Battle of Lundby in north-eastern Himmerland results in great Danish losses. It becomes the last battle of the Second Schleswig War.
 8 July – The Cabinet of Monrad is succeeded by the Cabinet of Bluhme.
 30 October – The Second Schleswig War ends. The Duchies of Schleswig, Holstein and Lauenburg are ceded to Prussia.

Undated

Births
  
 9 February – August Hassel, sculptor (died 1942)
 6 May – Jens Christian Kofoed, architect (died 1941)
 15 May – Vilhelm Hammershøi, painter (died 1916)
 23 May – Louis Glass, composer (died 1936)
 12 July – Carl Brummer, architect (died 1953)
 16 August – Kristian Hude, photographer (died 1929)
 15 November – Sophus Falck, manufacturer and founder of Falck (died 1926)

Deaths
 28 March – Princess Louise Charlotte, princess of Denmark (born 1789)
 7 September - Gustav Friedrich Hetsch, architect (born 1788)
 20 October – Carl Christian Rafn, historian, translator and antiquarian (born 1795)
 17 November – Peter Christian Knudtzon, businessman (born 1789)

References

 
1860s in Denmark
Denmark
Years of the 19th century in Denmark